The Chino Valley is a sub−valley section of the large Pomona Valley, located in southwestern San Bernardino County, California.

Geography
The cities of Chino Hills and Chino comprise the Chino Valley. The two cities have a combined population of approximately 175,000, and are part of the Inland Empire region.

The Chino Valley is east of the low Chino Hills mountain range. Chino Creek flows through the western side of the valley.

Education
Chino Valley Unified School District
Chaffey College

Major thoroughfares 
 Chino Valley Freeway (State Route 71)
 Pomona Freeway (State Route 60) 
 California State Route 142 — Chino Hills Parkway & Carbon Canyon Road, to Lambert Road in Brea.
 Grand Avenue
 Edison Avenue
 Ramona Avenue
 Peyton Drive
 Central Avenue
 Soquel Canyon Parkway
 Butterfield Ranch Road
 Riverside Drive
 Chino Avenue

See also
Chino Hills State Park

External links
Chino Valley Chamber of Commerce

Pomona Valley
Valley
Valley
Valleys of San Bernardino County, California